A blackout gag is a kind of joke in broad, rapid-fire slapstick comedy. The term is derived from burlesque and vaudeville, when the lights were quickly turned off after the punchline of a joke to accentuate it and/or allow for audience laughter. It may use a shock value to define the joke, and may not be initially noticeable to all viewers if it is a very fast joke.

It is distinguished from an iris shot, frequently used in the silent film era, where a black circle closes to end a scene.

The term "blackout gag" can also apply to fast-paced television or film comedy, such as Rowan & Martin's Laugh-In, where there may not literally be a blackout, but a quick cut to the next gag.

References

Film and video terminology
Comedy
Slapstick comedy